The 1989 FIFA U-16 World Championship, the third edition of the tournament, was held in the Scottish cities of Glasgow, Edinburgh, Motherwell, Aberdeen, and Dundee between 10 June and 24 June 1989. Players born after 1 August 1972 could participate in this tournament. Saudi Arabia won the tournament and became the first Asian team to win a FIFA tournament. As of December 2022, they are the only Asian men's team to win any FIFA tournament.

The winning team was later accused of fielding several over-age players, but no formal investigation was conducted.

Qualified teams

Squads
For full squad lists for the 1989 U-16 World Championship see 1989 FIFA U-16 World Championship squads.

Referees

Asia
  Mohammad Riyani
  Wan Rashid Jaafar
  Kil Ki-Chul
  Arie Frost
Africa
  Mohamed Hafez
  Ally Hafidhi
  M Hounake-Kouassi
CONCACAF
  David Brummitt
  Juan Pablo Escobar
  Arlington Success

South America
  Ricardo Calabria
  Luís Félix Ferreira
  Armando Pérez Hoyos
Europe
  Jean-Marie Lartigot
  Peter Mikkelsen
  George Smith
  Wieland Ziller
Oceania
  Gary Fleet

Group stage

Group A

Group B

Group C

Group D

Knockout stage

Quarter-finals

Semifinals

Playoff for 3rd place

Final

Result

Goalscorers
Fode Camara of Guinea won the Golden Shoe award for scoring three goals. In total, 77 goals were scored by 55 different players, with three of them credited as own goals.

3 goals

 Khaled Jasem
 Fode Camara
 Gil Gomes
 Tulipa
 Khalid Al Rowaihi

2 goals

 Márcio
 Carlos
 Frank Seifert
 Toralf Konetzke
 Kayode Keshiro
 Victor Ikpeba
 Luís Figo
 John Lindsay
 Kevin McGoldrick
 Jabarti Al Shamrani
 Anthony Wood
 Imad Baba

1 goal

 Claudio Paris
 Diego Castagno Suárez
 Gabriel Dascanio
 Jose Castro
 Leonardo Selenzo
 Anthony Pangallo
 Jeff Suzor
 Steve Corica
 Hassan Ebrahim
 Mohamed Abdulaziz
 Marcello Melli
 Gao Feng
 Alfredo Nieto
 Carlos Moreno
 Modesto Gaibao
 Bernardo Rosette
 Geosmany Zerguera
 Daniel Knuth
 Rene Rydlewicz
 Sven Manke
 Bernard Aryee
 Isaac Asare
 Souleymane Oularé
 Babajide Oguntunase
 Olusegun Fetuga
 Sunny Umoru
 Adalberto
 Sérgio Lourenço
 Alreshoudi Sulaiman
 Waleed Al Terair
 Brian O'Neil
 Ian Downie
 James Beattie
 Paul Dickov
 Todd Haskins

Own goal
 Luis Medero (against Canada)
 Omar Canate (against Portugal)
 Mory Fofana (against Saudi Arabia)

Final ranking

References

External links
FIFA U-16 World Championship Scotland 1989, FIFA.com
FIFA Technical Report (Part 1), (Part 2) and (Part 3)
Scottish Football Association: U16 World Cup Squad of 1989 Reunite via archive.org

FIFA
FIFA U-16 World Championship
International association football competitions hosted by Scotland
FIFA U-17 World Cup tournaments
FIFA U-16 World Championship
Sports competitions in Aberdeen
Sports competitions in Dundee
Sports competitions in Edinburgh
International sports competitions in Glasgow
Sport in Motherwell
Football in Aberdeen
Football in Dundee
Football in Glasgow
Football in Edinburgh
Football in North Lanarkshire